WRXR-FM (105.5 MHz) is a commercial radio station licensed to Rossville, Georgia, United States, broadcasting to the Chattanooga, Tennessee, area.  WRXR broadcasts an active rock music format branded as "Rock 105". WRXR was the second station in Chattanooga to start broadcasting in HD radio.  It is owned by Audacy, Inc.    Its studios are located on Old Lee Road in Chattanooga, and its transmitter is located in Rossville.

History
The station was originally known as WOWE and played rock and heavy metal music under the name "Rock 105". The station changed call letters to WLMX in December 1986 and went under the name "Lite Mix 105".

On September 15, 1999, Cumulus Broadcasting changed WLMX back to "Rock 105, The Rock of Chattanooga". Sammy George, Cumulus market manager, described the new active rock format as "radio with an attitude." Artists included Metallica, Pearl Jam, AC/DC and Nirvana. Programming also included NASCAR and Lex and Terry in the morning. The other Cumulus stations at that time were WUSY, WKXJ, WLMX (AM), & WLOV.

In 2000, Cumulus announced it would buy 11 radio stations in 4 markets from iHeartMedia (then known as Clear Channel Communications) in exchange for 25 radio stations in 5 markets plus cash as a part of that company's merger with AMFM Incorporated.

On November 1, 2017, iHeartMedia announced that WRXR, along with all of their sister stations in Chattanooga and Richmond, would be sold to Entercom as part of that company's merger with CBS Radio. The sale was completed on December 19, 2017.

References

External links

RXR-FM
Active rock radio stations in the United States
Audacy, Inc. radio stations
Radio stations established in 1966
1966 establishments in Georgia (U.S. state)